Ivan Ploshtakov (born 1 February 1986) is a Bulgarian footballer who plays as a forward for Maritsa Plovdiv.

References

1986 births
Living people
Bulgarian footballers
FC Maritsa Plovdiv players
PFC CSKA Sofia players
PFC Rodopa Smolyan players
FC Spartak Plovdiv players
Botev Plovdiv players
First Professional Football League (Bulgaria) players
Association football forwards